Jefferson Hills is a borough in Allegheny County, Pennsylvania, United States. It includes the community of Large. In the 2020 census the population was 12,424. Jefferson Hills was created as Jefferson Township, incorporating on January 22, 1828, and named  after Thomas Jefferson. The borough is a part of West Jefferson Hills School District. Before 1998, the borough was known as Jefferson.

Government

Structure
Jefferson Hills is a borough, run by an elected seven-member council and mayor. The administrative staff run by the borough manager runs the borough to the objectives set by the council.

Local officials 
Council President
·         Melissa Steffey
Council Vice President
·         Hilary Budd
Council Members
·         Karen Bucy
·         Joseph Lynch
·         David Montgomery
·         Keith Reynolds 
·         Nicole Ruscitto
Mayor
.          Carrie McCaffrey

State and federal officials 
Jefferson Hills is represented by John Fetterman and Bob Casey, Jr. in the United States Senate and Mike Doyle of the 18th District of Pennsylvania in the House of Representatives. The borough's representative in the Pennsylvania State Senate is Devlin Robinson of the 37th District and Mike Puskaric of the 39th Legislative District in the Pennsylvania House of Representatives. The District Court judge for Jefferson Hills is Michael Thatcher.

Safety
Jefferson Hills police department is in the Municipal Center. It has 18 officers and several community service staff. The police take part in programs such as Drug Abuse Resistance Education in the West Jefferson Hills School District. The force belongs to TUPPER, in which police from nine nearby communities collaborate, sharing regional criminal information. It also takes part in the Pennsylvania Attorney General's Regional Narcotic Task Force and the South Hills DUI task force.

The borough has emergency management and volunteer firefighters. There are three volunteer fire companies - Floreffe Volunteer Fire Company, Gill Hall Volunteer Fire Company and Jefferson 885 Fire Company.

Crime
Crime in Jefferson Hills is well below state and national averages. The rates for 2005, based per 100,000 people:

Politics

Geography
Jefferson Hills is at  (40.285502, −79.933160).

The borough includes rolling hills and woods. The southeastern border is the Monongahela River. Three streams flow through the borough: Peters Creek, Beam Run, and Lewis Run.

The borough consists primarily of single family homes of newer construction.

Surrounding municipalities
Jefferson Hills has six land borders with Pleasant Hills and West Mifflin to the north, Clairton to the east, West Elizabeth to the southeast, Union Township in Washington County to the south, and South Park Township to the west. Across the Monongahela River, Jefferson Hills runs adjacent with Elizabeth Township, Elizabeth Borough and Forward Township.

Climate

Demographics

As of the census of 2000, there were 9,666 people, 3,781 households, and 2,688 families residing in the borough. The population density was 583.5 people per square mile (225.2/km2). There were 3,954 housing units at an average density of 238.7 per square mile (92.1/km2). The racial makeup of the borough was 96.76% White, 1.31% African American, 0.17% Native American, 1.09% Asian, 0.14% from other races, and 0.53% from two or more races. Hispanic or Latino of any race were 0.69% of the population.

There were 3,781 households, out of which 31.7% had children under the age of 18 living with them, 60.0% were married couples living together, 8.3% had a female householder with no husband present, and 28.9% were non-families. 24.7% of all households were made up of individuals, and 10.3% had someone living alone who was 65 years of age or older. The average household size was 2.51 and the average family size was 3.04.

In the borough the population was spread out, with 24.0% under the age of 18, 5.8% from 18 to 24, 28.9% from 25 to 44, 24.6% from 45 to 64, and 16.8% who were 65 years of age or older. The median age was 41 years. For every 100 females, there were 91.7 males. For every 100 females age 18 and over, there were 90.1 males.

The borough is overwhelmingly Middle Class. The median income for a household in the borough was $50,615, and the median income for a family was $60,767. Males had a median income of $43,972 versus $36,052 for females. The per capita income for the borough was $23,006. About 2.7% of families and 4.1% of the population were below the poverty line, including 4.6% of those under age 18 and 5.1% of those age 65 or over.

History

The area was the geographic base of the Peters Creek Rangers during the Revolutionary War.

Recreation

Municipal parks
The municipality operates five parks including Gill Hall Park, Andrew Reilly Memorial Park, Lobb's Park, Beedle Park, and Tepe Park spread throughout the community. These parks offer a variety of amenities from various sports fields, tennis and basketball courts, and playground equipment. Additionally, the borough has several pavilions and the Gill Hall Community Center available to rent to borough residents.

Great Allegheny Passage

The Great Allegheny Passage is a system of biking and hiking trails spanning . These trails run from Cumberland, Maryland to Pittsburgh. In 2006, the Great Allegheny Passage connected with the C & O Canal Trail to create a  journey from Pittsburgh to Washington, D.C. This effort was coordinated by the Allegheny Trail Alliance, an organization of the seven-member trails stretching from Pennsylvania to Maryland.

Jefferson Hills is uniquely positioned with two members of that Alliance, the Montour Trail and Steel Valley Trail system, intersecting in nearby Clairton. Local trailheads include Triphammer Road, Jefferson Hills (Gill Hall Road), Route 51 - Large, and Clairton trailheads.

Montour Trail
The Montour Trail is a multipurpose trail extending  from Coraopolis to Clairton. The trail is made of crushed limestone, making it ideal for biking, walking, and cross-country skiing in the winter. The Montour Trail also connects with the Panhandle Trail, a trail of  trail between Carnegie, Pennsylvania and Weirton, West Virginia.

Steel Valley Trail
The Steel Valley Trail runs  from Clairton through McKeesport to West Homestead. The Mckessport-West Homestead section is part of the GAP trail which connects Washington, D.C. to Pittsburgh solely on bike trails. At the Clairton Trailhead  it connects to the Montour Trail which is a   loop south of Pittsburgh.

Infrastructure

Transportation

Major roads
Two major roads run through Jefferson Hills, PA Route 51 and PA Route 43. Route 51 runs from Uniontown to the Pennsylvania/Ohio border. In Jefferson Hills Route 51 serves as the terminus for Route 43, otherwise known as the Mon–Fayette Expressway. Route 43 is a toll road and part of the Pennsylvania Turnpike system.

Public transportation
The Port Authority of Allegheny County offers bus services in and around Jefferson Hills. There are several buses that directly pass through the borough, including:

Airports
Jefferson Hills is located 45 minutes to the southeast of Pittsburgh International Airport, which handles most air travel in the Pittsburgh metro area. Additionally, the borough is a short drive away from the Allegheny County Airport, located in the neighboring South Hills community of West Mifflin. The Allegheny County Airport serves as the primary FAA-designated reliever airport for Pittsburgh International Airport. In this role the airport supports a high volume of business and corporate-related activity.

Utilities
Electricity generation in Jefferson Hills is supplied by both Allegheny Power and Duquesne Light. Natural gas service for the borough is supplied by Equitable Gas Company. Republic Services handles the trash removal and recycling for Jefferson Hills.

Healthcare

Jefferson Hills is home to AHN Jefferson Hospital, formerly Jefferson Regional Medical Center, a 373-bed hospital $30 million hospital that opened in the spring of 1977.  It serves the South Hills region of Pittsburgh.

Media

Newspaper
As with all communities in the Pittsburgh area, Jefferson Hills receives the Pittsburgh Post-Gazette, . The borough has two local papers, the South Hills Record and the Union-Finley Messenger.

Television
Jefferson Hills as a member of the Pittsburgh metro area is served by a variety of local television and radio stations. The major network television affiliates are KDKA-TV 2 (CBS), WTAE-TV 4 (ABC), WPXI 11 (NBC), WQED 13 (PBS), WPGH-TV 53 (Fox), WPCW 19 (CW), WINP-TV 16 (Ion), WPNT 22 (MyNetworkTV), and WPCB 40 (Cornerstone). WEPA-CD 16 is an independent station owned and operated by the Bruno-Goodworth Network.

Radio
There are a wide variety of radio stations serving the Pittsburgh market. The first was KDKA 1020 AM, which is also the first commercially licensed radio station in the United States, receiving its license on October 27, 1920. Other popular stations include KQV 1410 AM (news), WPGP 1250 AM (conservative talk), WKST-FM 96.1 FM (pop and hip-hop), WBZZ 100.7 FM (adult contemporary), WDVE 102.5 FM (album rock), WPGB 104.7 FM (talk), WXDX 105.9 FM (modern rock), and WAMO 106.7 (hip-hop, rap). There are also three public radio stations in the area; including WESA 90.5 FM (National Public Radio affiliate operated by Duquesne University), WQED 89.3 FM (classical), and WYEP 91.3 FM (adult alternative). Three non-commercial stations are run by Carnegie Mellon University (WRCT 88.3 FM), the University of Pittsburgh (WPTS 92.1 FM), and Point Park University (WPPJ 670 AM).

References

External links

 Borough of Jefferson Hills official website
 Map to Jefferson Hills Municipal Center
 Jefferson Hills Public Library
 Jefferson Hills Emergency Management
 Peters Creek Historical Society
 West Jefferson Hills Historical Society
 West Jefferson Hills School District
 West Jefferson Hills Chamber of Commerce
 Pleasant Hills Community Presbyterian Church

Populated places established in 1784
Pittsburgh metropolitan area
Boroughs in Allegheny County, Pennsylvania
1828 establishments in Pennsylvania